2011 HKFC International Soccer Sevens, officially known as The HKFC Citibank International Soccer Sevens due to sponsorship reason, is the 12th staging of this competition. It was held on 13–15 May 2011. In this year, the number of teams competing in Masters Tournament is reduced from 16 to 12.

Squads

Masters tournament
Group A
 Nottingham Forest Mobsters: John Fawcett, Steve Guinan, Darren Heyes, Jon Olav Hjelde, Nigel Jemson, Dean Locke, Des Lyttle, Justin Walker, Darren Wassall, Alan Wright
 KFC Tokyo
 HKFC Chairman's Select
 Discovery Bay

Group B
 Citibank All Stars: Fraser Digby, John Beresford, Steve Howey, Des Walker, Rob Lee, Darren Currie, Craig Hignett, Tommy Mooney, Mark Kinsella, Keith Ryan
 Top Class FC: Tam Siu Wai, Chiu Chung Man, Yeung Hei Chi
 SCC Tigers
 Kowloon Cricket Club

Group C
 AC Milan Soccer Schools: Mustapha Hadji
 Team Bondi: Andrew Prentice, Luke Casserly, Craig Moore, Steve Walker, Tim Bredbury, Vladimir Zorić, Gary Braude, Scott Ollerenshaw, Brad Maloney, Phil Wolanski
 HKFC Veterans
 Bangkok Airways1

Note 1: Replacing Shanghai Shooters

Main tournament
Group A
 Celtic F.C.: Bahrudin Atajić, Nick Feely, Patrik Twardzik, Marcus Fraser, Greig Spence, Joseph Chalmers, John Herron, Rhys Murrell-Williamson, Paul George, Liam Gormley
 Liverpool: Deale Chamberlain, Steven Irwin, Stephen Darby, Jakub Sokolik, Nathan Eccleston, David Amoo, Thomas Ince, Suso, Nikola Sarić, Nicolaj Køhlert
 Hong Kong u18s
 Yau Yee League Select

Group B
 Rangers F.C.: Archie Campbell, Gordon Dick, Rhys McCabe, Andrew Mitchell, Kal Naismith, Ross Perry, Robbie Crawford, Chris Hegarty, Ewan McNeil, Alan Smith
 Boca Juniors: Lucas Quispe, Javier Ruiz, Matias Krueger, Tomas Puentes, Matias Sosa, Lautaro Gauna, Agustin Rodriguez, Julian Argen, Lionel Caceres, Gabriel Munoz (Head Coach: Fernando Larrañaga)
 Hong Kong u21s: Liu Fu Yuen, Ma Siu Kwan, Wong Chui Shing, Li Shu Yeung, Yuen Tsun Tung, Yan Pak Long, Hung Jing Yip, Kot Cho Wai, Choi Kwok Wai, Nam Wing Hang
 Singapore Cricket Club

Group C
 Aston Villa: Shane Lowry, Jonathan Hogg, Eric Lichaj, Benjamin Siegrist, Nathan Baker, Chris Herd, Andreas Weimann, Ellis Deeney, Daniel Johnson, Harry Forrester
 Citizen: Tse Tak Him, Yeung Chi Lun, Fung Kai Hong, Tam Lok Hin, Paulinho, Chan Man Chun, Moses Mensah, Festus Baise, Sandro, Sham Kwok Fai
 Eastleigh FC
 HKFC Captain's Select: Ng Kwok Hei, Jack Sealy, Gergely Zoltan Gheczy, Martin Rainer, Poon Ka Ming, James Ha, Allan Fraser, Lo Yiu Hung, Liam Brannan, Michael Campion

Group D
 Ajax: Jordy Deckers, Henri Toivomäki, Ricardo van Rhijn, Johan Kappelhof, Dico Koppers, Lorenzo Burnet, Roly Bonevacia, Glenn van Zoolinger, Yener Arica, Tom Boere, Florian Jozefzoon (Coaches: Gery Vink, Yannis Anastasiou; Team Manager: Dick Schoenaker)
 Kitchee: Li Jian, Chan Man Fai, José María Díaz, Lam Ka Wai, Cheng Siu Wai, Dani Cancela, Fernando Recio, Roberto Losada, Lo Kwan Yee, Ubay Luzardo
 Fourway Rangers2: Leung Hing Kit, Edson Minga, Iu Wai, Makhosonke Bhengu, Chak Ting Fung, Jean-Jacques Kilama, Lo Chi Kwan, Beto, Leung Wai Kit, John Emmanuel
 Hong Kong Football Club: Rudolf Hollaender, James Beacher, Seun Ologkigbe Tunde, Reda Chaouch, Nicklas Sandor, Frederik Schipper, Kwok Kar Lok, Amro Abbas, Kento Kurasako, Chung Tsz Fung

Note 2: Replacing Etoile FC

Main Tournament - Group Stage

Group A

Group B

Group C

Group D

Main Tournament - Knockout Stage 

Knockout stage was held on 15 May 2011.

Plate
 Bottom two teams of each group entered the quarter-finals of Plate.

Shield
 Losing teams of Cup quarter-finals entered the semi-finals of Shield.

Cup
 Top two teams of each group entered the quarter-finals of Cup.

References

Hong
Hon